Ralfs Freibergs (born 17 May 1991) is a Latvian professional ice hockey defenceman, who currently plays for Dinamo Riga of the Kontinental Hockey League (KHL).

Playing career
After first playing professionally in his native Latvia, Freibergs moved to North America as a junior and played collegiate hockey with the  Bowling Green State University Falcons in the NCAA league. Freibergs was a member of Latvia men's national ice hockey team, and he has played in 2013 IIHF World Championship as well as the 2014 Winter Olympics.

On 8 August 2014, Freibergs signed his first North American professional contract in agreeing to a one-year American Hockey League deal with the St. John's IceCaps. Freibergs appeared in 5 games with the IceCaps. However, he was reassigned to ECHL affiliate, the Ontario Reign for the majority of the campaign.

Leading into the 2015–16 season, Freibergs accepted an invitation to the Grand Rapids Griffins training camp on 28 September 2015. He was reassigned and signed an ECHL contract with affiliate Toledo Walleye on October 6, 2015.

On July 15, 2016, Freibergs returned to his native Latvia as a free agent from North America, signing a contract with Dinamo Riga of the KHL.

International play
Freibergs competed in the 2014 Winter Olympics, being the only active NCAA hockey player to compete in the men's tournament.  His first appearance was in the third game when he logged 4:56 of ice time.  Freibergs also competed in the elimination round games against Switzerland and Canada.

The International Olympic Committee (IOC) announced on 25 April 2014 that Freibergs was excluded from the XXII Olympic Winter Games in Sochi.  Freibergs provided a urine sample on 22 February whose A and B samples indicated the presence of dehydrochloromethyl-testosterone metabolite 18-nor-17b-hydroxymethyl-17a-methyl-4- chloro-5b-androst-13-en-3a-ol.

Career statistics

Regular season and playoffs

International

References

External links 

1991 births
Doping cases in ice hockey
Latvian sportspeople in doping cases
Latvian ice hockey defencemen
Living people
Ice hockey players at the 2014 Winter Olympics
Ice hockey players at the 2022 Winter Olympics
Olympic ice hockey players of Latvia
Ice hockey people from Riga
Texas Tornado players
Lincoln Stars players
Bowling Green Falcons men's ice hockey players
St. John's IceCaps players
Ontario Reign (ECHL) players
Toledo Walleye players
Dinamo Riga players
PSG Berani Zlín players
HC Kometa Brno players
HC Oceláři Třinec players
HC Litvínov players
Iserlohn Roosters players
Latvian expatriate ice hockey people
Latvian expatriate sportspeople in the United States
Latvian expatriate sportspeople in Canada
Latvian expatriate sportspeople in the Czech Republic
Latvian expatriate sportspeople in Germany
Expatriate ice hockey players in the United States
Expatriate ice hockey players in Canada
Expatriate ice hockey players in the Czech Republic
Expatriate ice hockey players in Germany